Løvlandfjellet is a mountain in Haakon VII Land at Spitsbergen, Svalbard. It reaches a height of 943 m.a.s.l., and is located north of Kongsfjorden, between  the glaciers of Junibreen, Løvlandbreen, Svansbreen, Maibreen and Fjortende Julibreen. The mountain is named after Norwegian politician Jørgen Løvland.

References

Mountains of Spitsbergen